Stanley Street may refer to:

Streets:
Stanley Street, Brisbane
Stanley Street, East Sydney
Stanley Street, Hong Kong
Stanley Street, Liverpool
Stanley Street (Montreal)
Stanley Street, Singapore

In fiction:
Stanley Street, the prime setting of the fictional London-based soap opera Family Affairs

Other uses:
ASB Tennis Centre, formerly called the "Stanley Street Courts", in Auckland, New Zealand